Rune Selj (born 8 June 1952) is a Norwegian politician for the Conservative Party.

He served as a deputy representative to the Norwegian Parliament from Oppland during the term from 1981 to 1985. In total he met during 8 days of parliamentary session.

References

1952 births
Living people
Deputy members of the Storting
Conservative Party (Norway) politicians
Oppland politicians
Place of birth missing (living people)
20th-century Norwegian politicians